Richard Umile (born December 21, 1948) is a former American men's ice hockey coach at the University of New Hampshire.  Coaching the Wildcats from 1990 through the 2018 season, Umile led UNH to the most wins in school history.

Career
Dick Umile was UNH’s coach from 1990 to 2018.  He attended the University of New Hampshire from 1968 - 1972, and played hockey for legendary UNH coach Charlie Holt. Upon graduation, Umile began his coaching career with the Watertown (Mass.) High School Red Raiders  .  He was named head coach in 1975, and proceeded to rebuild the previously unsuccessful team into a state champion during the next ten years. In 1985, Umile jumped into the college ranks by becoming assistant coach to the newly appointed head coach at Providence College, former UNH teammate Mike McShane, where Dick worked for two years prior to becoming a scout for the NHL St.Louis Blues.

In 1988 Umile ran into Bob Kullen who was recovering from a recent heart transplant and was enticed to return to his alma mater as an assistant coach. Two seasons later, Kullen's health took a sudden turn for the worst and Umile was thrust into the head coaching position just prior to the 1990–91 season. The season soon became dedicated to Kullen when the former coach died on November 2 and the team responded by giving New Hampshire its first winning season in seven years. After the season, Umile was awarded with Hockey East's Coach of the Year Award, newly renamed in Bob Kullen's Honor.

The Wildcats advanced to the NCAA tournament for the first time in a decade. Four years later New Hampshire would win its first Hockey East Regular season title, and its first conference title in 23 years, behind a then-record 28-win season. Two years later the Wildcats would post their first 30-win season and marched all the way to the 1999 NCAA Championship Game before being defeated by conference rival Maine, 3-2 in overtime. New Hampshire would continue to perform strongly under Umile, returning as a semi-finalist in the 2002 NCAA Frozen Four tournament, and then making it back to the Frozen Four Championship game in 2003, where the Wildcats lost to Minnesota, 5-1.

Over the course of his 28 years at the helm, Umile coached the Wildcats to 22 winning seasons, with twenty of them having at least 20 wins. He holds the school record for most statistical categories including Frozen Four appearances (4), NCAA Tournament appearances (18), consecutive tournament appearances (10), and Conference Regular season Titles (7), and is the only coach in school history to provide conference tournament titles (2002 and 2003). For his efforts, Umile received the Bob Kullen Coach of the Year Award a record six times, as well as the Spencer Penrose Award in 1999.  Dick was named to both the Italian-American Hall of Fame (2007) and the New Hampshire Legends of Hockey (2009).  He retired after the 2017-18 season.

Head coaching record

College

† Maine was required to forfeit 13 games after the conclusion of the season and subsequently dropped from 1st place to 3rd, though they are still considered league champions for the year

See also
List of college men's ice hockey coaches with 400 wins

External links

External links

1948 births
Living people
American ice hockey coaches
High school ice hockey coaches in the United States
New Hampshire Wildcats men's ice hockey players
New Hampshire Wildcats men's ice hockey coaches
People from Melrose, Massachusetts
Sportspeople from Middlesex County, Massachusetts